The Art (sometimes stylized as THEART) are an Australian alternative rock band based in Sydney. They began performing under the name The Follow in 2002, changing their name to The ART in 2004.

History 
Founded in 2002 and plucked from the obscurity of Australia's far north and into a circuit of international showcases, this act of cross-dressing black sheep tore through their infancy with cannonball velocity. Then named 'The Follow', the juxtaposition of youthful naivety and aggressive performance proved potently enchanting, as did the powerful charisma of the founding members, Kara Jayne (aka KJ) and Azaria Byrne.

Since the founding of The Art, the band have successfully toured with The Pixies, Sonic Youth, Marilyn Manson, Steel Panther, Thirty Seconds to Mars, Nine Inch Nails, Linkin Park, Twisted Sister, Faster Pussycat, Amanda Palmer and more.

In 2016 they toured Australia alongside The Superjesus and The Cult, playing sold out venues in every major Australian city. Their setlist includes the likes of "Minute to Madness", "Dead Inside", and "Sugar Queen" from their All in the Mind album, which was produced by Stevie Knight at Electric Sun Studios in Sydney.

The year 2017 has seen The Art back at home, creating new music...or have they just been pre-occupied "Thinking about the Universe"? With their single released in June 2017, the enigmatic performers were on the road in July 2017 promoting their new album for a run of spellbinding shows of pure rock 'n roll, which always leaves their audience begging for more.  

A darkly perfumed oddity, eclectic in emotional elements and delivered with blistering rock and roll impact, stylistically, The Art are difficult to categorise. They are powerfully rhythmic and richly poetic. Their honest and expressive lyricism serves as uncensored substance to the acts natural knack for pandemonium, anthemic songwriting. Nobody at an 'Art' show leaves unaffected.

Former members 
 Azaria Byrne - Vocals/Guitar 
 Kara Jayne - Bass/Vocals
 Jordan McDonald - Drums
 Isac Cole - Lead Guitar

References 

Australian alternative rock groups
Musical groups from Sydney
Musical groups established in 2004